Thuidiaceae is a family of mosses within the order Hypnales. It includes many genera but the classification may need to be refined. The core genera are Thuidium, Thuidiopsis, Pelekium, Aequatoriella, Abietinella, Rauiella, Haplocladium and Actinothuidium form a clade but others currently placed in the family may belong elsewhere.

Species include Thuidiopsis sparsa and Abietinella abietina

Genera
As accepted by GBIF;

 Abietinella  (4)
 Actinothuidium  (1)
 Aequatoriella  (1)
 Anomodon  (55)
 Boulaya  (1)
 Bryochenea  (2)
 Bryohaplocladium (10)
 Bryonoguchia  (2)
 Claopodium  (18)
 Cyrto-hypnum  (39)
 Echinophyllum   (1)
 Haplocladium   (46)
 Helodium  (7)
 Herpetineuron  (3)
 Heterocladium  (22)
 Hylocomiopsis  (3)
 Indothuidium  (1)
 Inouethuidium  (1)
 Leptocladium  (1)
 Leptopterigynandrum  (13)
 Lorentzia (3)
 Miyabea  (5)
 Orthothuidium  (1)
 Pelekium  (36)
 Ptychodium  (15)
 Rauiella  (15)
 Tamariscella  (3)
 Tetracladium (moss)Tetracladium  (1)
 Thuidiopsis  (15)
 Thuidium''  (223)

Figures in brackets are approx. how many species per genus.

References

External links 
 Thuidiaceae

Hypnales
Moss families